Rendered Waters is the twelfth album by American/German rock band Kingdom Come. All but three tracks on this disc are old material from previous albums.

Track listing

Band members 
Lenny Wolf—lead vocals, bass, guitar
Eric Förster—lead guitar
Frank Binke—bass guitar
Nader Rahy—drums

Credits 
Produced by Lenny Wolf
Recorded and Mixed at Two Square Noise Factory, Hamburg, Germany
Mastered by Hanan Rubinstein at The Hub, Berlin, Germany

References

External links
 Lenny Wolf – Official website

Kingdom Come (band) albums
2011 albums